is a town located in Kanoashi District, Shimane Prefecture, Japan. As of March 2017, the town has an estimated population of 7,478 and a density of 25.0 persons per km². The total area is 307.09 km².

Description
Tsuwano is remotely located and surrounded by hills. Though geographically closer to Yamaguchi, the capital of Yamaguchi Prefecture, it is in Shimane Prefecture. A train trip to Matsue, Shimane’s capital, takes as long as four hours. As it is close to Yamaguchi Prefecture, many tourists who come to Tsuwano also visit Hagi on the Sea of Japan and Yamaguchi at the same time, and Tsuwano is often mistaken as being in Yamaguchi prefecture.

Popularly called the "Little Kyoto of San-In," Tsuwano is known for its picturesque main street, "Tono-machi," which is lined with Edo-era buildings and Koi ponds.  It also boasts one of the oldest still-used "Yabusame" (horse back archery) ranges in all of Japan, and its annual Yabusame festival on the second Sunday of April is a large tourist draw for the San-In region.

On September 25, 2005 the town of Nichihara was merged into Tsuwano.

Unusually, Tsuwano is somewhat home to two Catholic churches. The Catholic church in Tsuwano itself is dedicated to Saint Francis Xavier, who visited Japan as a missionary in 1549–50, and is located on its main street. The Santa Maria Church at Otome Pass was dedicated in 1951 and is part of a memorial for 37 Japanese Christians persecuted and tortured in Tsuwano by the government during the Edo and Meiji periods.

Other notable locations and tourist attractions within Tsuwano include the ruins of Tsuwano Castle, where the Kamei clan ruled the Tsuwano fiefdom from the 17th through mid 19th-centuries, and the mountainside Taikodani Inari shrine with its "1000 vermilion torii." In 1773 Tsuwano's seventh-generation feudal lord Kamei Norisada had Taikodani Inari built to enshrine a share of the spirit worshipped at the Fushimi Inari in Kyoto. This shrine was built to pray for the safety of Kamei's castle and peace among his people.  As one of five major Inari shrines in Japan, it attracts people from throughout western Japan to pray for prosperity and good fortune in the coming year.

Geography

Climate
Tsuwano has a humid subtropical climate (Köppen climate classification Cfa) with very warm summers and cool winters. Precipitation is abundant throughout the year.

Demographics
Per Japanese census data, the population of Tsuwano in 2020 is 6,875 people. Tsuwano has been conducting censuses since 1920.

Notable people 
Novelist Mori Ōgai was born in Tsuwano into a family of doctors, and the house of his birth is preserved. Mori studied medicine in Germany and led the adoption of German medical practices into the Japanese military. In commemoration, Tsuwano became a sister city of Berlin-Mitte under an agreement signed August 25, 1995. Mori's tomb is in Yomei-ji Temple in Tsuwano, built in 1420 and known as one of two great Sōtō sect temples (the other being Daijo-ji Temple in Kanazawa).

Philosopher Nishi Amane, another leader of Japan’s modernization in the Meiji period, was also born in Tsuwano. His ancestors were physicians for the daimyō of the fief.

Tsuwano has two new art galleries to celebrate artistic sons. One, the Anno Art Museum (opened in 2001), is dedicated to Mitsumasa Anno, born and raised in Tsuwano. The other is the Shisei Kuwabara Photographics Museum, the name since April 1, 2004 of what was previously the Tsuwano Documentary Photograph Gallery; this shows photographs by and is named after Shisei Kuwabara, known for his work in Minamata and Korea.

Rie Fujii (b. 1971) is also from Tsuwano.  In 2001, Fujii abandoned her two infant children in their apartment in Calgary, Alberta. She returned to the apartment after ten days, when she found both infants had died of starvation and/or dehydration.  Fujii was convicted of manslaughter in a Canadian court, and served five years of an eight-year sentence, after which she was deported to Japan.

Yamaguchi-gō steam locomotive 

A popular tourist destination, Tsuwano is served by the steam locomotive Yamaguchi-gō, which runs once daily on weekends, national holidays, and certain other days between March and November (daily in August) on the Yamaguchi Line between Shin-Yamaguchi Station to Tsuwano. It stops for about three hours in Tsuwano before returning to Shin-Yamaguchi station. The train is usually pulled by a C57 locomotive, but a C56 does the job on several weekdays between July and September, and both engines are linked in a double-header configuration on weekends in August. Carriages are decorated in the styles of three Japanese eras—Meiji, Taisho, and Showa—as well as in European style, and the rearmost carriage has an outdoor observation deck.

A scene in director Masahiro Shinoda’s Spy Sorge, a 2003 movie about Soviet spy Richard Sorge, was shot on the train for period effect.

References

External links

 
 Tsuwano Tourism Association
 Official website 

Towns in Shimane Prefecture